Chassen Road railway station is in the Trafford metropolitan borough of Greater Manchester in the north west of England. The station was opened by the Cheshire Lines Committee on 10 September 1934. The station, and all services calling there, is operated by Northern Trains.

Facilities
The station has a very small ticket office on the Manchester-bound platform which is open on weekday mornings only (06:55 to 10:00).  Tickets must be purchased on the train or in advance at all other times.

Each platform has a small covered waiting area and step-free access from the road via ramps.  Train running information is provided by timetable posters and telephone.

Services

Services are every two hours in each direction, towards Flixton and Liverpool Lime Street to the west and towards Urmston and Manchester Oxford Road in the east. Extra services call at this station during the peak-hours, however the station is closed on Sundays.

References

External links

Railway stations in Trafford
DfT Category E stations
Former Cheshire Lines Committee stations
Northern franchise railway stations
Railway stations in Great Britain opened in 1934